Aïssatou Cissé or Aissatou Cisse (born 1970/1) is a Senegal writer with disabilities who became an advisor to the President of Senegal.

Life
Cissé was born in Niayes Thioker in Dakar in about 1971. Her mother had rheumatism and during the birth Cissé's hands and feet were dislocated by the people assisting the birth. This left Cissé with permanent disabilities. She was able to achieve a lot with the support of her parents.

Cissé has become a successful writer. She wrote her debut novel Zeina in 2002 and Linguère Fatim two years later. She won an award in Libya.

She wrote about the injustice of a Senegalese girl who was sent to jail for having an illegal abortion. This was despite the mitigation of the pregnancy having resulted from her being raped at the age of thirteen.

Cissé was appointed a special advisor to Senegal's president, Macky Sall. She has worked with the Minister of Health and Social Action to improve the country's sports facilities for people with disabilities. She assists with a Senagalese organisation called ASEDEME. ASEDEME is a self-help group started in 1989 to assist 50 children with learning difficulties to have an education.

References

1970s births
Living people
People from Dakar
21st-century Senegalese writers
Senegalese women writers
Senegalese novelists